Hilal Ahmar Tabriz Futsal Club (Persian: باشگاه فوتسال هلال احمر تبریز) was an Iranian Futsal club based in Tabriz. Hilal Ahmar took over the licence of Gostaresh Foolad Tabriz in 2012-13 Super League.

Season-by-season 
The table below chronicles the achievements of the Club in various competitions.

players

Current squad

Notable players

  Shahram Sharifzadeh

References

External links
Hilal Ahmar's Stats and History in PersianLeague

Futsal clubs in Iran
Sport in Tabriz
2014 disestablishments in Iran
Defunct futsal clubs in Iran